is a train station in Ebino, Japan. It is operated by JR Kyushu and is on the Kitto Line.

Lines

Layout 
The station consists of an island platform serving two tracks at grade. The station building is a modern concrete block structure which is now unstaffed and serves only as a waiting room. Access to the island platform is by means of a level crossing with ramps. Parking and a bike shed are available at the forecourt.

Adjacent stations

History
Kyōmachi Onsen (at that time named ) was opened on the same day as one of several intermediate stations along the track. On 6 December 1932, the same stretch was separated out and was designated as the Kitto Line with Miyakonojō as the starting point. With the privatization of Japanese National Railways (JNR), the successor of JGR, on 1 April 1987, Kyōmachi came under the control of JR Kyushu. On 1 November 1990, Kyōmachi was renamed Kyōmachi Onsen.

Passenger statistics
In fiscal 2016, the station was used by an average of 69 passengers (boarding only) per day.

See also
List of railway stations in Japan

References

External links
Kyōmachi Onsen (JR Kyushu)

Railway stations in Miyazaki Prefecture
Railway stations in Japan opened in 1912